The insulin-like growth factor II (IGF-II) internal ribosome entry site IRES is found in the 5' UTR of IGF-II leader 2 mRNA. This RNA element allows cap-independent translation of the mRNA and it is thought that this family may facilitate a continuous IGF-II production in rapidly dividing cells during development. Ribosomal scanning on human insulin-like growth factor II (IGF-II) is hard to comprehend due to one open reading frame and the ability for the hormone to fold into a stable structure.

References

External links 
 
 IRESite page for IGF2 leader2

Cis-regulatory RNA elements